Otoniel Gonzaga may refer to:
 Otoniel Gonzaga (sport shooter)
 Otoniel Gonzaga (tenor singer)